Biruwa Guthi  is a village development committee in Parsa District in the Narayani Zone of southern Nepal. At the time of the 2011 Nepal census it had a population of 13,248 people living in 2,350 individual households. There were 6,608 males and 6,640 females at the time of census.

name of villages of Biruwa Guthi
Ward No 2

Prasuram Pur
Sabaiya
sabaiya tadi 
Ward No 1
Biruwa guthi
Ramtol
jhabrah(Jhapra)
Jhulitar

Ward No 5
Badnihar
 pakadiya
Ward No 4
Barwa tadi
baknerwa
Ward No 9
Hardaspur

Ward No 8
chhotaili

References

Populated places in Parsa District